Saint-Thuribe is a parish municipality in the Capitale-Nationale region of Quebec, Canada.

Demographics 

Population trend:
 Population in 2011: 288 (2006 to 2011 population change: -5.0%)
 Population in 2006: 303
 Population in 2001: 313
 Population in 1996: 360
 Population in 1991: 410

Mother tongue:
 English as first language: 0%
 French as first language: 100%
 English and French as first language: 0%
 Other as first language: 0%

References

Incorporated places in Capitale-Nationale
Parish municipalities in Quebec